Saint, in comics, may refer to:

Saint (manhua), a Chinese comic from Hong Kong manhua artist Khoo Fuk Lung
Saint, a Marvel Comics character who has appeared in a number of horror comics. They are Quincy Harker's dog.
The Saint, Avon Comics published 12 issues of The Saint comic book between 1947 and 1952 (some of these stories were reprinted in the 1980s)

It may also refer to:

Saint Germaine (comics), a comic book from Caliber Comics
Saint of Killers, a character and eponymous mini-series from Preacher, which was published by Vertigo
Saint Sinner (comics), a Marvel Comics horror title

See also
Saint (disambiguation)

References